KSOU-FM (93.9 FM) is a radio station broadcasting an adult contemporary format. Serving the Sioux Center area in the U.S. state of Iowa, the station is licensed to Sorenson Broadcasting Corp.

History
The station began broadcasting in 1974 as KVDB-FM, with "VDB" being a subtle reference to its owner, Russell Vande Brake. KVDB-FM was the sister station to KVDB (1090 AM, now KSOU), which broadcast from the same studio. During the day, they had separate programming, but in the evening, an easy listening format was simulcast over both stations.

On August 1, 1989, the station changed its call sign to KTSB; on April 1, 1996, it changed to the current KSOU-FM.

References

External links

SOU-FM
Mainstream adult contemporary radio stations in the United States
Radio stations established in 1974
Sioux Center, Iowa